Latifabad may refer to:
 Latifabad, Hamadan
 Latifabad, Lorestan
 Latifabad, Razavi Khorasan